Tecolote is an impact crater on Mars.  It was named by the IAU in 1991 after the town of Tecolote in New Mexico.

Tecolote is within the Claritas Fossae.

References 

Impact craters on Mars